Jack Lutz is a theoretical computer scientist and computational theorist best known for developing the concepts of resource bounded measure and effective dimension. He is currently a professor at Iowa State University.

External links
Homepage of Jack Lutz at Iowa State University

American computer scientists
Iowa State University faculty
Living people
Year of birth missing (living people)
Place of birth missing (living people)
California Institute of Technology alumni